Liang Daoming was an abscondee of the Chinese Ming Dynasty who became king of Palembang in Srivijaya. He hailed from Guangdong province and was of Cantonese descent. According to the Ming records, he had thousands of followers and a sizable military contingent in Palembang. Liang Daoming's rule over Palembang was acknowledged by the Ming emperor and protected by Zheng He's armada (1403-1424).

See also
 Chen Zuyi
 Chinese emigration
 Piracy in the Strait of Malacca
 Malacca Sultanate
 Haijin

References

Cantonese people
Chinese pirates
Chinese diaspora
Ming dynasty people
Precolonial states of Indonesia
14th-century Chinese people
Srivijaya
Palembang
14th-century Indonesian people
15th-century Indonesian people
15th-century Chinese people